The Burger School for Students with Autism was established in 1973 as the Developmental Learning Program. Burger School is operated by the Garden City School District for the Wayne County Regional Educational Agency. It accepts students from preschool to high school, from age 3 to 26, from 34 school districts in Wayne County, Michigan.

History  
The Developmental Learning Program is a program within the Garden City Public Schools that began in 1973. In 2014, the Developmental Learning Program moved to one of its two current locations and took its present name. The school now supports two campuses.

The Burger Baylor School for Students with Autism is located in Inkster, in the former Baylor-Woodson Elementary School of Inkster Public Schools.

See also
 List of schools for people on the autism spectrum

References

External links
 

Schools for people on the autistic spectrum
Special schools in the United States
Educational institutions established in 1973
Schools in Wayne County, Michigan
Public K-12 schools in Michigan
1973 establishments in Michigan
Autism-related organizations in the United States
Mental health organizations in Michigan
Inkster, Michigan